Antrophyum is a genus of ferns  in the family Pteridaceae. They are commonly known as lineleaf ferns.

Description
Like most other vittarioid ferns, members of the genus have simple, straplike leaves. The leaves have netlike venation, with three or more rows of areolae ("gaps" in the net of veins) on either side of the midline. Linear sori are borne along the veins throughout the underside of the leaf. Paraphyses (miniature hairs) are present on the sori (separating the genus from Polytaenium); the cells at the tips of the paraphyses may be spherical or slender, and spores are trilete. (By comparison, Scoliosorus and Antrophyopsis always have spherical cells at the tips of their paraphyses, and monolete spores.)

Taxonomy
The genus was first described by Georg Friedrich Kaulfuss in 1824. He included in it several species placed in Hemionitis by Carl Ludwig Willdenow, distinguishing them on the basis of their reticulate, indusiate sori sunken into the leaf tissue. The name means "growing from a cavity", a reference to the growth of the sori from a groove in the leaf. In 1875, John Smith designated Antrophyum plantagineum as the lectotype for the genus.
Species include:  
Antrophyum alatum Brack.
Antrophyum annamense Tardieu & C.Chr.
Antrophyum annetii (Jeanp.) Tardieu
Antrophyum austroqueenslandicum D. L. Jones
Antrophyum brookei Hook.
Antrophyum cajenense  – Forked lineleaf fern
Antrophyum callifolium Blume – Ox-tongue Fern
Antrophyum castaneum H.Itô
Antrophyum clementis Christ
Antrophyum coriaceum (D. Don) Wall. ex Moore
Antrophyum costatum Alderw.
Antrophyum formosanum Hieron.
Antrophyum henryi Hieron.
Antrophyum immersum (Bory) Mett.
Antrophyum intramarginale  – Tufted lineleaf fern
Antrophyum jagoanum D.L.Jones & Bostock
Antrophyum lancifolium Rosenst.
Antrophyum latifolium Blume
Antrophyum ledermannii Hier.
Antrophyum lessonii Bory
Antrophyum malgassicum C. Chr.
Antrophyum megistophyllum Copel.
Antrophyum novae-caledoniae Hieron.
Antrophyum obovatum Bak.
Antrophyum ovatum Alderw.
Antrophyum parvulum Bl.
Antrophyum plantagineum (Cav.) Kaulf.
Antrophyum ponapense H.Itô
Antrophyum reticulatum (Forst.) Kaulf.
Antrophyum semicostatum Bl.
Antrophyum sessilifolium (Cav.) Spreng.
Antrophyum simulans Alderw.
Antrophyum smithii C. Chr.
Antrophyum spathulatum Alderw.
Antrophyum strictum Mett.
Antrophyum subfalcatum Brackenr.
Antrophyum trivittatum C. Chr.
Antrophyum vittarioides Bak.
Antrophyum williamsii Benedict
Antrophyum winitii Tag. & Iwatsuki
Antrophyum zosteraefolium Fée

The subgenus Antrophyopsis, containing the species A. bivittatum C. Chr., A. boryanum Willd., and A. mannianum Hook. (later treated in Scoliosorus), was elevated to a genus in 2016.

Distribution
Most species occur in tropical Asia and the Pacific, but A. immersum and A. malgassicum are known from Africa and the Indian Ocean.

References

Pteridaceae
Epiphytes
Fern genera